Lawrence A. Bowes (January 1, 1885 – June 5, 1955) was an American actor. He appeared in 22 films between 1915 and 1921.He was born in Newark, California, United States and died in Glendale, California.

External links

1885 births
1955 deaths
American male film actors
American male silent film actors
People from Newark, California
20th-century American male actors